Margaret Tu Chuan (January 1, 1942 - November 30, 1969, aged 27) was a Hong Kong actress.

Career
She made her first film, The Magic Touch, in 1958.  The film was directed by Li Han Hsiang who discovered her at age seventeen.
She starred in movies such as When The Peach Blossoms Bloom  (1959), The Kingdom And The Beauty (1959) and Madam White Snake  (1962) with Betty Loh Ti and Lin Dai  before her death in 1969.  Diary Of A Lady-Killer (1969) was the last role she starred in before committing suicide by taking an overdose of sleeping pills with a female lover after a failed marriage.

Filmography
Diary of a Lady-Killer (1969)
Yan yang tian (1967) .... Hong Ling 
The Black Falcon (1967) .... Hu Mei 
Te jing 009  (1964)
Bian cheng san xia (1966) .... Chieh Ying 
Hu xia jian chou (1966) .... Hsiao Ching 
Shan ge yin yuan (1965) .... Sung Yu-lan 
The Black Forest (1964) .... Meidana 
Between Tears and Smiles  (1964)
Di er chun (1963) 
Her Sister's Keeper (Hong Kong: English title) 
Miao ren miao shi  (1962) 
Madame White Snake (1962) (as Tu Chuan) .... Qingqing 
The Dream of the Red Chamber  (1962) 
Shou qiang (1961) 
Shen xian lao hu gou (1961) .... Sun Man-li 
Ge qiang yan shi(1961) 
Mang mu de ai qing (1961) .... Lu Lu-chi 
Oh Boys! Oh Girls! (1961)) 
Jie da huan xi (1961) 
When the Peach Blossoms Bloom (1960) (as Juan Du) 
The Secret of Miss Pai (1960) 
How to Marry a Millionaire (1960) (Hong Kong: English title) 
The Malayan Affair (1960)
Twilight Hours (1960)  
Spring Song (1959) (as Xiaoping Peng) 
Hou men (1959) 
Kingdom and the Beauty  (1959) .... Village Girl 
Miao shou hui chun  (1958)

References

External links

 HK cinemagic entry
 1962 magazine article featuring Margaret Tu Chuan

1942 births
Suicides in Hong Kong
Bisexual actresses
1969 suicides
20th-century Hong Kong actresses
Drug-related deaths in Hong Kong
Drug-related suicides in China
Hong Kong LGBT actors
20th-century LGBT people
Shaw Brothers Studio